Zaheeda Hussain (born 9 October 1944), commonly known by her mononym Zaheeda, is an Indian former actress. Born in Mumbai, she is daughter of Akhtar Hussain, who was film producer and the son of director Jaddanbai. Her aunt was actress Nargis Dutt, and her uncle was character actor Anwar Hussain.

Zaheeda is best known for appearing in films such as Anokhi Raat (1968), Gambler (1971), and Prem Pujari (1970). She was originally offered by Dev Anand to appear as Jasbir/Janice in the cult-film Hare Rama Hare Krishna (1971), however she turned it down as she was reluctant to play the hero’s sister, and wanted to play the role of his beloved (played by Mumtaz); the role of Jasbir/ Janice went to Zeenat Aman and she had shot to fame. Meanwhile, Zaheeda continued to play the heroine and majority of her later films flopped, leading her to eventually retire the film industry.

Personal life
Zaheeda Hussain later married a businessman, Kesri Nandan Sahay and retired from the film industry. She has two sons, one of which, Nilesh Sahay,  made his feature film debut with choreographer Ganesh Acharya's' Angel in 2011.

Selected filmography

References

External links
 

Living people
1944 births
20th-century Indian actresses
Indian film actresses
Actresses from Mumbai
Actresses in Hindi cinema